Netane Muti (born March 27, 1999) is an American football guard for the Las Vegas Raiders of the National Football League (NFL). He played college football at Fresno State.

High school career
A two-way lineman for Leilehua, Muti was not highly recruited coming out of high school. He originally committed to play for his home state's Hawaii Rainbow Warriors, signing a letter of intent with the University of Hawai'i on National Signing Day. However, after his application was put on hold due to a test score, he asked for and was granted release from U.H. and went on to sign with Fresno State.

College career
Muti redshirted in his first season at Fresno State following an Achilles injury suffered in preseason.

In 2017, as a redshirt freshman, Muti started all 14 games, as a member of an offensive line which ranked third in the nation in sacks and tackles for loss allowed. For his performance, he received Honorable Mention All-Mountain West honors.

In 2018, his campaign was cut short by a season-ending Achilles injury suffered in the third game of the season.

In 2019, as a redshirt junior, he was again struck by injury, as a season-ending Lisfranc foot injury sidelined him for the final nine games of the year.

In January 2020, despite having played only five full games over the previous two seasons, Muti announced that he would forgo his final season of college eligibility and declare for the 2020 NFL Draft.

Muti was cleared by doctors at the 2020 NFL Scouting Combine, where his bench press was the highest total at the 2020 NFL Scouting Combine.

Professional career

Denver Broncos
Muti was selected by the Denver Broncos with the 181st overall pick in the sixth round of the 2020 NFL Draft. He was placed on the active/non-football injury list at the start of training camp on July 28, 2020, and he was moved back to the active roster six days later.

On August 30, 2022, Muti was waived by the Broncos and signed to the practice squad the next day.

Las Vegas Raiders
On December 13, 2022, Muti was signed by the Las Vegas Raiders off the Broncos practice squad.

On March 9, 2023, Muti re-signed with the Raiders.

Personal life
Muti was born and raised in Tonga (where he learned to play rugby) before later moving to Wahiawa, Hawaii where he started to play football

References

1999 births
Living people
Tongan players of American football
People from Wahiawa, Hawaii
Players of American football from Hawaii
American football offensive guards
Fresno State Bulldogs football players
Denver Broncos players
Tongan emigrants to the United States
Las Vegas Raiders players